The RIT Tigers represented the Rochester Institute of Technology in College Hockey America during the 2016-17 NCAA Division I women's ice hockey season.

Standings

Offseason
September 1: 2016 graduate Jetta Rackleff and 2014 graduate Erin Zach were each selected in the Canadian Women's Hockey League draft.

Recruiting

Roster

2016–17 Tigers

Schedule

|-
!colspan=12 style=| Regular Season

|-
!colspan=12 style=| CHA Tournament

Awards and honors

 Mackenzie Stone  CHA Best Defensive Forward
 Caitlin Wallace  CHA Individual Sportsmanship Award
 Terra Lanteigne, Goaltender  CHA All-Rookie Team

References

RIT
RIT Tigers women's ice hockey seasons
Sports in Rochester, New York
RIT Tigers women's ice hockey
RIT Tigers women's ice hockey